The No WTO Combo was a one-shot punk rock band started by Krist Novoselic (former Nirvana bassist). The band consisted of Jello Biafra (former frontman of Dead Kennedys); guitarist Kim Thayil of Soundgarden; and the rhythm section of Sweet 75, with Gina Mainwal on drums and Novoselic on bass.

They were originally scheduled to play the Showbox November 30, the night before the WTO meeting of 1999 in Seattle, but the performance was canceled because the venue's staff could not get past the police "curfew zone."

They rescheduled the show for the next night, December 1, but Biafra and Novoselic played a short acoustic set that night down the street at The Central Tavern, where Biafra was approached by local record producer Mark Cavener. Cavener offered to record the album at the Showbox the next evening. The performance itself would be the first formal concert played by Thayil since the demise of Soundgarden a few years beforehand, and only the second time Biafra had played music in a planned live setting since Dead Kennedys split in 1986.

Novoselic later asked Jack Endino to mix the recordings, resulting in the bands' only release, Live from the Battle in Seattle, distributed by Biafra's record label Alternative Tentacles.

Band members
Jello Biafra – vocals
Kim Thayil – guitar
Krist Novoselic – bass
Gina Mainwal – drums

Footnotes

References

External links
 Official soundtrack of the Cardboard Turtle Insurrection

American hardcore punk groups
Alternative Tentacles artists
Anti-globalization organizations
Musical groups established in 1999
Musical_groups_disestablished_in_1999
1999 establishments in the United States